Bobby Rowand (30 August 1906 – 23 February 1974) was a Scotland international rugby union player. He played as a Flanker.

Rugby Union career

Amateur career

Rowand came to the High School of Glasgow in 1921 from Paisley Grammar School. He did not play rugby until his final year at the High School in 1922-23. However he was very athletic, breaking the school's 19 year old high jump record, represented the school in both the high jump and long jump, and was very good at tennis.

Rowand played for Glasgow HSFP, initially on the wing, before he found his favourite position at flanker.

Provincial career

He was capped by Glasgow District in 1929. He played for Glasgow against South Africa on 28 October 1931.

He played for the Scotland Probables side against the Scotland Possibles side on 14 January 1933 while still with Glasgow HSFP.

International career

Rowand was capped by Scotland 7 times from 1930 to 1934.

Farming career

After his rugby union career finished, he went back to his family farm at Candrens near Paisley. His family had farmed there for over 300 years.

Family

He was the son of John Rowand (1860-1936) and Mary Gardner (1866-1943). John Rowand was a farmer at Candrens and a director of the Renfrewshire Agricultural Society.

Bobby Rowand married Margaret Laird in Rosebank Church, Cambuslang on 21 November 1934. Jimmie Ireland was his best man.

Bobby and Margaret had 2 sons John and Rab, and a daughter Liz.

Death

He died in the Victoria Infirmary in Glasgow on 23 February 1974. The service was in Paisley Abbey, and his body was taken to Woodside Crematorium.

References

1906 births
1974 deaths
Scotland Probables players
Glasgow District (rugby union) players
Glasgow HSFP players
Scotland international rugby union players
Scottish rugby union players